Carrickobreen or Carrickobrien is a townland in County Westmeath, Ireland. The townland is in the civil parish of St. Mary's.

The townland is located to the south of Athlone, and stands on the banks of the River Shannon, which forms the border with County Roscommon.

References 

Townlands of County Westmeath